Under Article 24 of the National Basketball Association (NBA) Constitution, the NBA commissioner has the power to hand down disciplinary actions (either suspensions or fines less than $60,000) on players for on-court incidents, conduct that does not conform to standards of fair play, conduct that does not comply with federal or state laws, and conduct that is detrimental to the game of basketball or the league. As defined by the 2005 Collective Bargaining Agreement (CBA) between the National Basketball Players Association (NBPA) and the NBA, any party (a player, a team, the NBA or the NBPA) can appeal to an arbitrator if a suspension is longer than 12 games or a fine is more than $50,000. If an appeal is filed, the arbitrator would have the power to either uphold or reject the decisions made by the commissioner. If the incident is serious enough, such as point shaving or substance abuse, players can be permanently banned from playing, although players banned for substance abuse are permitted to be reinstated two years later under the anti-drug agreement between the league and the NBPA.

In the league's early years, a handful of players were banned permanently because of their involvement with point shaving in college, although Connie Hawkins was able to overturn the ban through litigation. Several more were banned permanently for abusing banned substances and they usually never returned, though some such as Micheal Ray Richardson and Chris Andersen were able to return to play after their bans were repealed. Among those suspended, Metta Sandiford-Artest (formerly known as Ron Artest at the time and then Metta World Peace later in his career) and Latrell Sprewell faced the most serious punishments for on-court altercations; they were suspended 86 and 68 games, respectively. Gilbert Arenas was also suspended for more than half of a regular season's games for bringing firearms into an arena and drawing them in a dispute with teammate Javaris Crittenton, who also got suspended for the rest of that season himself. In more recent years, under Adam Silver's tenure as commissioner, other people involved with NBA teams beyond just the players have faced serious punishments for their actions themselves. Most notably, former Los Angeles Clippers owner Donald Sterling was permanently banned from the NBA for a leaked conversation condemning black people from coming to his games, primarily former Los Angeles Lakers player Magic Johnson. However, Golden State Warriors minority owner Mark Stevens, former Phoenix Suns majority team owner Robert Sarver, and Boston Celtics head coach Ime Udoka have also faced season-long suspensions for actions considered detrimental to the league.

Permanently banned

Permanently banned but later reinstated
Most cases where a player has been banned from the NBA but later reinstated are a result of the league's anti-drug policy, which was started back in 1983 after a rise in drugs like cocaine and methamphetamine had occurred. The policy, developed jointly between the NBA and the players' association, made a third illegal drug use offense punishable by a ban, although a player could apply for reinstatement after a minimum of two years (or in the case of Jalen Harris, only one year).

Suspended
Only suspensions lasting six games or more are included.

See also
 List of players and coaches suspended by the NFL
 Steroid use in American football
 List of people banned from Major League Baseball
 List of Major League Baseball players suspended for performance-enhancing drugs
 National Basketball Association criticisms and controversies

References

 
Banned
Banned